Pneumonyssoides is a monotypic genus of mites belonging to the family Halarachnidae. The only species is Pneumonyssoides caninum. It is one of the most commonly studied species of Halarachnidae found in dogs.

They are oval shaped. Adults in this species can measure from 1.5 to 0.6 mm in length.

The species is found in North America. They have a world wide distribution.

References

Mesostigmata
Acari genera
Monotypic arachnid genera